Limor Shmerling Magazanik is a thought leader in digital technology policy, ethics and regulation. She is an expert in data governance, privacy, AI ethics and cybersecurity policy. Since November 2018, she has been the managing director of the Israel Tech Policy Institute (ITPI) and a senior fellow at the Future of Privacy Forum. She is a visiting scholar at the Duke University Sanford School of Public Policy. Previously, for 10 years, she was director at the Israeli Privacy Protection Authority and an adjunct lecturer at the Hebrew University of Jerusalem Faculty of Law and the Interdisciplinary Center Herzliya School of Law and a research advisor at the Milken Innovation Center. Her background also includes positions in the private sector, law firms and high-tech industry. She has promoted policy initiatives in various technology sectors and has been an advocate for compliance with data protection and privacy by design.

Magazanik is on the World's Top 50 Women in Tech 2018 on Forbes List.

Education 
Magazanik has a Master of Arts (M.A.) degree in literature with a special focus on women and gender studies, a Master of Law (L.L.M) in public law and a Bachelor of Law (L.L.B) all acquired at Tel Aviv University.

While at the Israeli Privacy Protection Authority with the Ministry of Justice, she acquired knowledge and training in courses such as computer investigations and digital evidence handling. 

Magazanik is also a Certified Privacy Professional by the International Association of Privacy Professionals (IAPP) for the European and US frameworks and for Privacy Management.

Career 
While working towards her L.L.B., Magazanik was a law intern at Pines, Harmlech, Milner Law Offices from 1995 to 1997 and, after, was a judicial intern for the Judicial Authority until 1998.

She was a project manager at I.T.L Product Testing Laboratories, from 1999 to 2000, where she focused on electrical safety and electromagnetic compatibility standard testing.

In 2000 and 2001, she was the marketing product manager for Jungo Connectivity, a Cisco company.

Magazanik was a partner at Magazanik-Shmerling Law in Tel Aviv from 2002 until 2007. As a legal advisor, she specialized in the fields of corporate law, property law and banking.

She was a legal secretary and advisor to the head of council in 2008 for the Cable and Satellite Broadcasting Council at the Israel Ministry of communications.

Magazanik worked with the Israel Privacy Protection Authority (PPA) at the Ministry of Justice for a decade, originally as director of licensing and inspection when her responsibilities included managing PPA's regulation and administrative enforcement activities over the private and public sectors. These included investigations and legal proceedings, in cases of privacy law infringements and licensing of digital signature providers and credit history providers. More recently she was director of strategic alliances, responsible for the creation and maintenance of strategic alliances with policy makers and regulators, media channels, academia, parliament, educators and the general public, in order to deliver policy and promote compliance with privacy regulations and generate public awareness of the subject. She also represented the authority in international and national enforcement collaborations. She testified before parliament committees and took part in legislation processes from inception to ratification and execution. She founded the Data Protection Forum in the Israeli public administration. She was a founding member of the Government Cloud Computing Committee, a member of the Oversight Committee over the Smart ID and Biometric Identification project, a member of the Investigating Committee: Promoting Competition in the Financial Sector, and a member of the advisory board to the Credit Data Bureaus Supervisor at the Central Bank of Israel.

Magazanik began her managing director position at the ITPI in 2018, where she engages policymakers, regulators, academics and business leaders and convenes multi-stakeholder groups for discussion in areas such as AI ethics, data governance, cybersecurity, digital health, e-government, fintech, smart cities and smart mobility and is a frequent participant in government consultations on these initiatives. She manages the fellows and researchers at the institute and oversees the publishing of reports, articles and filing positions. 

Magazanik is a member of the OECD Data Governance and Privacy Expert Group.

Articles and publications 
Using Health Data for Research: Evolving National Policies

Artificial Intelligence in Government – Implementing Algorithmic Decision-Making Systems in Welfare Services

Accelerating Digital Transformation: What are the required Building Blocks?Supporting Health Innovation With Fair 

Supporting Health Innovation With Fair Information Practice Principles - Key issues emerging from the OECD-Israel Workshop.

References 

Living people
Israeli educators
Year of birth missing (living people)